Wives on Strike  is a 2016 Nigerian film produced and directed by Omoni Oboli and starring Uche Jombo, Chioma Akpotha,
Ufuoma McDermott, and Kehinde Bankole.

Cast 
 Uche Jombo
 Chioma Akpotha
 Ufuoma McDermott
 Kehinde Bankole 
 Kalu Ikeagwu
 Julius Agwu
 Kenneth Okonkwo
 Sola Sobowale

Plot 
A satire about a group of market women who denied their husbands of sex, in a bid to stir them into standing up for a young girl, who was compelled by her father to marry a man against her will. The film was shot in the heat of the #ChildNotBride conversation.

Reception

Critical reception 
Irede Abumere for Pulse praised the story and the use the amusing approach adopted in the screenplay for addressing stern issues. Tush Magazine rated it 4/5, and applauded the imminent message and social issues raised in the film.

Box office 
Upon release, the film was reported to have broken several records at the Nigerian box office.

References 

Nigerian comedy films
2016 films
Films about child sexual abuse